

Incumbents
President: Patrice Talon

Events
16 March - 1st case of the COVID-19 pandemic in Benin
19 March - 2nd case

References

 
2020s in Benin
Years of the 21st century in Benin
Benin